GE MDS (formerly Microwave Data Systems, Inc. “MDS”) is a company that designs, manufactures, and sells wireless communications equipment for the industrial market. GEMDS is headquartered in Rochester, NY. All research and development and manufacturing is done in Rochester, NY (USA). MDS was a subsidiary of Moseley Associates and was acquired, in January 2007, by GE Multilin which was a division of General Electric. The company then became known as GE MDS, LLC. Prior to being a subsidiary of Moseley, Microwave Data Systems was a part of California Microwave.

GE MDS Products include "point-to-point" and "point-to-multipoint" radios that operate in the licensed and unlicensed (ISM band) frequency bands under 6GHz. The company is known particularly for long range communications, interference rejection, industrial quality, and high reliability. Customer applications are typically industrial and long range: Electric power distribution, Oil and Gas Wellhead monitoring, monitoring Oil and Gas pipeline transport, Railroad locomotive and wayside communications, Water/Waste-water monitoring, etc.

History
Microwave Data Systems (MDS) was originally part of California Microwave (CalMic). As California Microwave consolidated and sold off businesses, CalMic changed its name to Adaptive Broadband.  Both California Microwave and Adaptive Broadband were public companies. MDS was sold to Moseley Associates   and operated as a private company for some time. General Electric's Multilin division inside GE Consumer and Industrial purchased Microwave Data Systems in 2007 and changed the official business name to "GE MDS, LLC."   GE MDS has operated under the following GE Divisions / Operating Units: GE Consumer and Industrial, GE Industrial, GE Enterprise Solutions, GE Digital Energy, GE Metering and Sensing, GE Energy Management, GE Grid Solutions, GE Automation & Controls, GE Renewable Energy, and GE Grid Solutions (again).

Currently GE MDS operates as a business unit inside GE Renewable Energy / GE Grid Solutions.

See also
 Wireless modem
 Wireless
 Public utility 
 Radio
 4G
 LTE (telecommunication)
 SCADA
 Gas flow computer

External links
Current website

 - Archived Website

References

Sources
 http://www.controleng.com/article/CA6433353.html

Technology companies of the United States
Privately held companies based in New York (state)
Wireless networking hardware
Electronics companies of the United States